Srebrenko Posavec (born 19 March 1980) is a Croatian retired football midfielder.

Club career
He finished his career in the Austrian lower leagues.

International career
He made his international debut against Hong Kong in a 4–0 win in Hong Kong's 2006 Lunar New Year Cup on 1 February 2006. This is his only appearance for the Croatia national football team.

References

External links
 

1980 births
Living people
People from Murska Sobota
Association football midfielders
Croatian footballers
Croatia international footballers
NK Varaždin players
Hannover 96 players
NK Slaven Belupo players
MKE Ankaragücü footballers
FC Koper players
Hunan Billows players
2. Bundesliga players
Croatian Football League players
Süper Lig players
Slovenian PrvaLiga players
China League One players
Croatian expatriate footballers
Expatriate footballers in Germany
Croatian expatriate sportspeople in Germany
Expatriate footballers in Turkey
Croatian expatriate sportspeople in Turkey
Expatriate footballers in Slovenia
Croatian expatriate sportspeople in Slovenia
Expatriate footballers in China
Croatian expatriate sportspeople in China
Expatriate footballers in Austria
Croatian expatriate sportspeople in Austria